Datuk Dr. Rahman bin Ismail is a Malaysian politician, social activist and medical doctor. He is the former Member of Parliament for the Gombak constituency. He served as an MP for his constituency from 2004-2008. He is a member of United Malays National Organisation (UMNO), a major component party in the Barisan Nasional (BN) coalition. Rahman Ismail also heavily involves in charitable/non-profit organisations. He founded and is currently the chairman of Gabungan NGO-NGO Gombak, a multiracial and mix confederation of 153 smaller NGOs in Gombak. The Academy of Medicine of Malaysia certifies Rahman Ismail as one of its members.

Internationally renowned
He is an internationally renowned doctor and a researcher. Dr. Rahman Ismail is an expert in vaccinology and epidemiology.

Education
Dr. Rahman Ismail, former Sekolah Sultan Alam Shah student, studied medicine at Universiti Kebangsaan Malaysia, Universiti Malaya, Johns Hopkins University, Pasteur Institute, and Centers for Disease Control and Prevention, Atlanta.

Medical career
Dr. Rahman Ismail is a Vaccinologist, Epidemiologist and a Clinical Trialist. He is also a well known expert in the Pharmaceutical and Vaccinology Fields. Considering his experience and skills in vaccinology in 1997 he was elected as the Medical and Scientific Director for the Asia Pacific Region when he joined Sanofi Pasteur International. Sanofi Pasteur is a vaccine producer company.

Currently he was appointed as an adviser for the Public Health Specialist Society and one also one of the panels for National Bio-Technology Council.

He has conducted many clinical trials, hospital trials, epidemiological studies, surveillance studies and involved in many major drugs and vaccine clinical development. He has published many of his studies in the local and international journals.

Dr. Rahman has also written many articles regarding his particular field of work.

Medik TV
Dr. Rahman Ismail was also the Chairman of Medik TV, a health television channel dedicated to educate the masses about healthcare and medical procedures. All the programs shown in the TV channel are accessible in all Malaysian government hospitals.

UMNO Member
Dr. Rahman Ismail became active with community service and later joined UMNO in 1986. Dr. Rahman Ismail represents the younger more vibrant leaders in UMNO and Barisan Nasional. His open mindedness and intellectual views when he was in parliament made him very popular.

General Elections Candidate for Gombak Parliamentary Seat
Dr. Rahman Ismail made his debut when he was picked as BN candidate to contest the 2004 general election and successfully won the Gombak parliamentary seat by beating Datuk Wira Dr. Mohd Hatta Ramli of Parti Islam Se-Malaysia (PAS). However he did not contest in the subsequent 2008 general election.

He was called to contest for the Gombak parliamentary seat as the BN candidate again in the 2013 general election going against Dato’ Seri  Azmin Ali of Parti Keadilan Rakyat (PKR). Azmin Ali however won with 4,734 votes or 4.49% majority.

Election results

Honours
 :
 Companion I of the Exalted Order of Malacca (DMSM) (2004)

See also
Gombak (federal constituency)

References

Living people
Malaysian public health doctors
Vaccinologists
United Malays National Organisation politicians
Malaysian people of Malay descent
Malaysian Muslims
Members of the Dewan Rakyat
Year of birth missing (living people)